Lanceopenna pentastigma is a moth in the family Gelechiidae. It was described by Anthonie Johannes Theodorus Janse in 1960. It is found in South Africa and Zimbabwe.

References

Gelechiinae
Moths described in 1960